Gene Harris of the Three Sounds is an album by American pianist Gene Harris recorded in 1972 and released on the Blue Note label. Although the title refers to Harris' group The Three Sounds the album is usually recognised as a solo effort as none of the other original members of the group participated in the recording.

Reception
The Allmusic review awarded the album 2½ stars.

Track listing
 "Django" (John Lewis)  
 "Lean on Me" (Bill Withers)  
 "A Day in the Life of a Fool" (Luiz Bonfá, Carl Sigman)  
 "John Brown's Body" (Traditional; arranged by Wade Marcus)   
 "Listen Here" (Eddie Harris)   
 "Emily" (Johnny Mandel, Johnny Mercer)  
 "Killer Joe" (Benny Golson)   
 "C Jam Blues" (Barney Bigard, Duke Ellington)  
Recorded at A&R Studios in New York City on June 29 (tracks 1, 3 & 4) and June 30 (tracks 2 & 5-7), 1972.

Personnel
Gene Harris - piano
Sam Brown, Cornell Dupree - guitar
Ron Carter - bass
Freddie Waits - drums
Johnny Rodriguez - conga
Omar Clay - percussion, vibes
Wade Marcus - arranger
Technical
George Butler - executive producer
Don Hahn - recording

References

Blue Note Records albums
Gene Harris albums
Jazz-funk albums
1972 albums
Albums arranged by Wade Marcus